Andrew Grima (31 May 1921 – 26 December 2007) was an Anglo-Italian designer who became known as the doyen of modern jewellery design in Britain.

Early life
Grima was born in Rome to Italian-Maltese parents and raised in London, where he attended Salesian College, Battersea and St Joseph's College, Upper Norwood. He later studied mechanical engineering at the University of Nottingham. The family was artistic and creative: his father was an embroidery designer and Grima's brothers became architects, helping design his London showroom in 1966.

Grima joined the Royal Engineers, serving in Burma in World War II with the 7th Indian Division of the British Army.

Jeweller
After the war, he started work in his father-in-law's jewellery firm in London, Haller Jewellery Company Limited (H.J. Co) initially in the accounts department, before moving into design.

He became the foremost modern jewellery designer in the West End of London in the 1960s and 1970s, selling designs from his exclusive gallery at 80 Jermyn Street, Mayfair featuring the world's first perspex spiral staircase (1970) built by Peter Rice and Ove Arup.  In 1970 he designed the successful "About Time" watch collection for Omega and in 1976 a collection of gold digital LED watches for Pulsar

Grima won several awards for his contribution to the jewellery industry. Namely, he was the only jeweller to win the Duke of Edinburgh Prize for Elegant Design and won 13 De Beers Diamonds International Awards; more than any other jeweller. His clients included members of the British Royal family, as well as Barbara Hepworth and Jacqueline Onassis.

Notable pieces include Queen Elizabeth II's ruby brooch, as well as a brooch of lichen cast in gold for Princess Margaret.
More recently, fans of his work have included fashion designers Miuccia Prada and Marc Jacobs.

Examples of Grima's work are held in the Victoria & Albert Museum and in the collection of the Worshipful Company of Goldsmiths.

On 20 September 2017 Bonhams auctioned the largest private Grima collection to ever be sold at auction.

In December 2020, the first monograph, "Andrew Grima: The Father of Modern Jewellery" written by William Grant was published by ACC Art Books

Personal life
Grima married twice, firstly in 1947 to Helène Haller, niece of the Viennese jeweller who brought Grima into the trade. The couple had a son and two daughters; they divorced in 1977.

The same year, Grima married Jojo Maughan-Brown, great-granddaughter of Sir Thomas Cullinan. They had one daughter, Francesca (born March 22, 1980), who – together with her mother – continues the family business.

In 1986 the Grimas moved to Switzerland, first to Lugano and in 1992 to Gstaad, where Grima died on 26 December 2007.

Francesca and Jojo moved back to London in 2012. They have continued the family business by creating unique and bespoke pieces handmade in Britain by Andrew's master craftsmen.

References

External links
Grima Jewellery
Obituary in The Times, 5 January 2008
'Grima the great: a personal recollection of a 1960s jewellery design visionary' in Wallpaper*, 19 September 2017
'Andrew Grima's Work Returns to the Spotlight' in The New York Times, 12 September 2017
'Collecting vintage Grima jewellery' in How To Spend It, 17 November 2017

1921 births
2007 deaths
British goldsmiths
British jewellery designers
Italian jewellery designers
Italian emigrants to the United Kingdom
British people in British Burma
British Army personnel of World War II
British expatriates in Switzerland